Georgia Balke (born  2010) is a German singer. She is the winner of Season 10 of The Voice Kids which premiered on March 4, 2022. The 11-year-old Georgia from Bremerhaven competed on the team coached by Michi & Smudo. She won the competition on May 6, 2022. Prior to this, she was the runner up of Season 13 of Das Supertalent (Germany's Got Talent).

References

External links 
Official website of the Voice Kids - Germany 
Official website of Germany's Got Talent (Das Supertalent) 

Kids Germany
The Voice (franchise) winners
The Voice (franchise) contestants
The Voice Kids contestants
Living people
2010s births